Altınapa Dam is a dam in Konya Province, Turkey, built between 1963 and 1967.

See also
List of dams and reservoirs in Turkey

External links
DSI

Dams in Konya Province
Dams completed in 1967